Shanghai Gold Apple Bilingual School ( "Shanghai City Private Gold Apple School") is a private boarding school for elementary through high school levels in Pudong, Shanghai. It opened in 2000. The Pudong Campus of the French School of Shanghai was on the property of the Gold Apple School.

References

External links

 Shanghai Gold Apple Bilingual School
 Shanghai Gold Apple Bilingual School 

Schools in Pudong
Educational institutions established in 2000
2000 establishments in China